Antonio Corgos Cervantes (born 10 March 1960 in Barcelona, Catalonia) is a retired long jumper from Spain. He won two silver medals at the European Athletics Indoor Championships as well as one at the 1982 European Athletics Championships. He was also a silver medallist at the 1983 Mediterranean Games and the 1983 Ibero-American Championships in Athletics. Corgos was an Olympic finalist on three occasions, his best result being fifth at the 1988 Seoul Olympics.

International competitions

References

External links

1960 births
Living people
Athletes from Barcelona
Spanish male long jumpers
Athletes from Catalonia
Olympic athletes of Spain
Athletes (track and field) at the 1980 Summer Olympics
Athletes (track and field) at the 1984 Summer Olympics
Athletes (track and field) at the 1988 Summer Olympics
European Athletics Championships medalists
World Athletics Championships athletes for Spain
Mediterranean Games silver medalists for Spain
Mediterranean Games medalists in athletics
Athletes (track and field) at the 1983 Mediterranean Games